Rastrococcus is a genus of true bugs belonging to the family Pseudococcidae.

The species of this genus are found in Africa, Southern Asia and Australia.

Species:

Rastrococcus asteliae 
Rastrococcus banksiae 
Rastrococcus biggeri 
Rastrococcus chinensis 
Rastrococcus expeditionis 
Rastrococcus iceryoides 
Rastrococcus invadens 
Rastrococcus jabadiu 
Rastrococcus kendariensis 
Rastrococcus lamingtoniensis 
Rastrococcus mangiferae 
Rastrococcus matileae 
Rastrococcus melaleucae 
Rastrococcus monachus 
Rastrococcus namartini 
Rastrococcus neoguineensis 
Rastrococcus nivalis 
Rastrococcus rubellus 
Rastrococcus spinosus 
Rastrococcus stolatus 
Rastrococcus taprobanicus 
Rastrococcus tropicasiaticus
Rastrococcus truncatispinus 
Rastrococcus vicorum 
Rastrococcus viridarii

References

Pseudococcidae